is a railway station on the Sasshō Line in Tōbetsu, Hokkaidō, Japan, operated by the Hokkaido Railway Company (JR Hokkaido). The station is numbered G12.

In addition, the area's names Tōbetsubuto and Bitoe are respectively from Ainu to-pet-put, meaning "estuary rises in a lake", and pon-pit-o-i, meaning "a place with a lot of gravel". However, JR Hokkaido has changed its station name from "Ishikari-Futomi" to "Futomi" since 12 March 2022.

Lines

Station layout
The station has two side platforms serving two tracks on the otherwise single-track section of the line east of Ainosato-Kyōikudai Station. The station has automated ticket machines and Kitaca card readers. The station is unattended.

History
Ishikari-Futomi Station opened on 20 November 1934.

References

Railway stations in Hokkaido Prefecture
Railway stations in Japan opened in 1934
Stations of Hokkaido Railway Company